Sonia Farré Fidalgo (born 3 January 1976 in Hospitalet de Llobregat) is a Catalan activist, teacher, and politician. She is a deputy in the Congress of Deputies in the XII Legislature.

Biography 
Graduating in  Catalan Philology, she worked as a Catalan teacher in secondary education. Since 1989 she has been a volunteer leisure instructor.

She started in politics as a result of the mobilizations of the 15M Movement in Sant Joan Despí. She has been part of the Citizen Debt Audit Platform and is a member of the Constituent Process in Catalonia. Linked to En Comú Podem-Guanyem el Canvi, she has been one of the promoters of the Municipal Citizens Observatory that has received the Memorial for Peace award from the Joseph Vidal i Llecha association. In the 2016 Spanish general elections she was elected deputy for the Province of Barcelona.

See also 
 Barcelona (Congress of Deputies constituency)

References 

1976 births
Living people
Spanish activists
Spanish women activists
Activists from Catalonia
Politicians from Catalonia
Women politicians from Catalonia
People from Barcelona
Women members of the Congress of Deputies (Spain)
Members of the 12th Congress of Deputies (Spain)

Teachers of Catalan